The  is a railway line in Shikoku, Japan, operated by Shikoku Railway Company (JR Shikoku). It connects  Station, Shimanto, Takaoka District in Kōchi Prefecture and Uwajima in Ehime Prefecture.

Route Description

The Yodo line is a quiet, rural single track line with passing places at some stations. The line, which is also known as Shimanto Green Line, is one of the most scenic in Japan running adjacent to the picturesque Shimanto River inland until Ekawasaki. It then winds its way across Ehime Prefecture to Uwajima.

Kubokawa Station on the Dosan Line serves as the departure point for nearly all trains heading west. The first part of the line, to Kawaoku Junction just after Wakai, is not owned by JR but by the Tosa Kuroshio Railway. This section makes up a part of the Tosa Kuroshio Railway Nakamura Line, not a JR line and therefore attracts an additional fare. Passengers, especially those using the Seishun 18 Kippu, are reminded of this by conductor announcements.

After Wakai, the Nakamura Line turns off and the Yodo Line officially begins. The Yodo line ends at a junction with the Yosan Line just before  and trains continue on the Yosan Line into Uwajima.

Services
The Yodo Line has only one sort of service, local trains that stop at every station.

In April 2020 there were five trips in each direction between Kubokawa and Uwajima and an additional three trips each way between Uwajima and Ekawasaki & Chikanaga.

Most services are wanman (driver-only) operated.

Stations
 All trains on the Yodo Line are local trains and stop at all stations.
 None of the intermediate stations along the line have a staffed ticket office.
 Trains can pass one another at stations marked "◇" and "^" and cannot pass at those marked "｜".

History
In 1914, the Uji Light Railway Co. opened a  gauge line 18 km between Uwajima and Chikanaga. In 1923, the line was extended 7 km from Chikanaga to Yoshino. In 1931 the Uwajima Railway began operating a single gasoline-powered locomotive.

The Uwajima Railway was nationalised by Japanese Government Railways in 1933, becoming the Uwajima Line; Miyanoshita Station was renamed Iyo-Miyanoshita Station, Nakano became Futana, and Yoshino was renamed Yoshinobu. 

The 10 km Yoshinobu - Ekawasaki section opened in 1953, and the 43 km Ekawasaki - Wakai section opened in 1974, linking to the Dosan Line with the line renamed as the Yodo Line. In the same year, CTC signalling was commissioned, and freight operations ceased.

References

External links

 JR Shikoku official website 

 
Lines of Shikoku Railway Company
Rail transport in Ehime Prefecture
Rail transport in Kōchi Prefecture
Railway lines opened in 1914
1067 mm gauge railways in Japan
1914 establishments in Japan